Christopher Crowhurst, better known by his stage name Chris Loco, is an English record producer and songwriter.

Discography

Production and songwriting credits

References

English DJs
English record producers
English songwriters